The  is a symphony orchestra based in Nagoya, Japan, founded in 1966.  The orchestra gives concerts primarily at the Aichi Prefectural Arts Theater Concert Hall and the Chukyo University Center for Culture & Arts Aurora Hall.

The orchestra gave their first subscription concert in October 1967.  In 1971, Hiroyuki Iwaki became the orchestra's first general music director, with the parallel appointment of Yoshikazu Fukumura as 'permanent conductor'.  This dual arrangement of conductors continued until the tenure of Yuzo Toyama as both general music director and permanent conductor from 1981 to 1987, the only conductor in the history of the orchestra to hold both titles.  During the tenure of Ken-Ichiro Kobayashi, the title of General Music Director was changed to Music Director, effective 2001.  The title of permanent conductor was discontinued, and the post of chief conductor was instituted, starting with Ryusuke Numajiri in 2003.

The orchestra's current chief conductor is Martyn Brabbins, who was named to the post in December 2011 and formally took up the chief conductorship with the 2013-2014 season.  Thierry Fischer, chief conductor from April 2008 through February 2011, now has the title of honorary guest conductor.  The orchestra's honorary conductor since 1993 is Moshe Atzmon, who was permanent conductor from 1987 to 1993.  Kobayashi has held the title of conductor laureate since 2003.  As of October 2013, the orchestra has Masahiko Enkoji as its Resident Conductor and Kentaro Kawase as its Conductor.

General Music Directors/Music Directors
 Hiroyuki Iwaki (1971-1974)
 Tadashi Mori (1974-1980)
 Yuzo Toyama (1981-1987)
 Ken-Ichiro Kobayashi (General Music Director, 1998-2001; Music Director, 2001-2003)

Conductors
 Kenichi Kiyota (1966-1973)
 Hiroyuki Iwaki (1971-1973)
 Yoshikazu Fukumura (1971-1974)
 Toshio Ukai (1972)
 Tadahi Mori (1974-1980)
 Shunji Aratani (1974-1980)
 Yuzo Toyama (1981-1987)
 Taizo Takemoto (1981-1983)
 Jyunichi Hirokami (1983-1984)
 Kenichiro Kobayashi (1984- )
 Kouki Tezuka (1984-1989)
  
 Moshe Atzmon (1987-1993)
 Taijiro Iimori (1993-1998)
 Ryusuke Numajiri (2003-2006)
 Thierry Fischer (2008-2011)
 Masahiko Enkoji (2011- )
 Martyn Brabbins (2013-2016)
 Kazuhiro Koizumi (2016- )

External links 
 Nagoya Philharmonic Orchestra English-language home page
 "Martyn Brabbins moves to NPO". International Arts Manager, 15 December 2011

Musical groups established in 1966
Japanese orchestras
Culture in Nagoya
1966 establishments in Japan